Theoretical Girls were a New York-based no wave band formed by Glenn Branca and Jeff Lohn (a conceptual artist and composer) that existed from 1977 to 1981. Theoretical Girls played only about 20 shows (three of which took place in Paris). It released one single ("U.S. Millie"/"You Got Me"), which had some attention in England where it sold a few thousand copies. The band was never signed by a record company, but is well regarded as an early leading no wave group that mixed classical modern ideas of composition with punk rock. This experimental music was mostly supported by the New York art world and minimal art music audience.

History

Theoretical Girls was formed after Branca and Lohn's previous group the Static and performed its first show at the Experimental Intermedia Foundation. Artist Jeff Wall came up with the band's name during a discussion of women making conceptual art. The Theoretical Girls were among the most enigmatic of the late 1970s no wave bands of the New York underground rock scene, famous not so much for their music, since they released only one single during their brief existence, but because the group launched the careers of two of New York's best known experimental music figures, composer Glenn Branca and producer Wharton Tiers. The latter played drums, the former guitar in the quartet, which also featured keyboardist Margaret De Wys and vocalist/guitarist Jeffrey Lohn, a classically trained composer who, like Branca and so many others in the no wave scene, wasn't interested in working with popular musical forms until inspired to do so by the explosion of punk rock. The group's sound shared aesthetics with the other no wave bands working in Manhattan at the time, such as The Contortions and DNA. 

Always confrontational and often funny in an aggressive way, the band's sound consistently displayed the influence of American minimalist composers, ranging from sparse, clattering rhythm pieces that sound like immediate forebears of early 1980s Sonic Youth, to abrasive slabs of art-punk noise music.

Two recordings subsequent to the dissolution of the band have emerged in recent years, helping to preserve the band's legacy. The first, which came out on Atavistic in 1995, consists of all the Glenn Branca-penned songs, including "You Got Me", the flipside from the group's only single. The A-side, "U.S. Millie," appears on a newer collection of Theoretical Girls songs all written by Lohn. That compendium owes its existence to Acute Records proprietor Daniel Selzer, who spent several years collaborating with Lohn to compile the songs, working from poorly recorded old rehearsal tapes and live reels.

Currently
Jeffrey Lohn resides in the East Village neighborhood of New York City and keeps to a private life. Glenn Branca continued to pursue a career as a musician, before succumbing to throat cancer on May 13, 2018 at the age of 69.

Discography

Single
 Theoretical Girls: You Got Me (Branca)/U.S. Millie (Lohn) 7" single, (Theoretical Records, 1978)

Collections
 Branca: The Static & Theoretical Girls: Songs '77-'79, (Atavistic Records, 1995)
compiles live and studio recordings by The Static and Theoretical Girls 1977-1979
 Theoretical Girls: Theoretical Record, (Acute Records, 2002)
compiles most known recorded work of Theoretical Girls

Compilation appearances
Various Artists - Out of Their Mouths (1996, Atavistic Records)
song: "You Got Me"
Various Artists - New York Noise (2003, Soul Jazz Records)
song: "You Got Me"
 DVD 135 Grand Street, New York, 1979 by Ericka Beckman

See also
Just Another Asshole
Parenthetical Girls
Mudd Club
Tier 3

Notes and references

References
 
 
 
Not Nothing: The Remains of No Wave

External links
Theoretical Girl in performance on the DVD 135 Grand Street, New York, 1979 by Ericka Beckman
 Theoretical Girls is the third track on Clocktower Colab Vinyl Mix (aired 5/9/16).

No wave groups
American musical duos
Musical groups established in 1977
Musical groups disestablished in 1981
1977 establishments in New York (state)
1981 disestablishments in New York (state)
American experimental musical groups
Musical groups from New York City